Gemilang is a Malaysian television drama series Malaysia broadcast by Filmscape in 2011. It features Shalihan, Tiz Zaqyah, Kamal Adli, Tasha Shilla and Datuk Jalaluddin Hassan. It aired on 24 January  2011 after 13 successful episodes. This drama tells us of four youths who opened private schools in remote areas for brighten the future of young children who do not excel in their studies.

Plot
Saifullah (Shah Jazle) comes from a family of rubber tappers are very difficult when the world hovered around rubber plantation in the 1960s. Saifullah have three more brothers. Four brothers when they were younger, their mother had died.

Not long after, their father would join their cause to separate siblings as given to the adoptive family. Saifullah a family of adopted children were, but he never forgot his origin.

Saifullah character is a courageous, courageous and strong. Teenager, Saifullah make his teacher, the teacher Talib (Datuk Jalaluddin Hassan) as his mentor.

As adults, Saifullah successfully continue their studies and after graduation he worked at the bank in the city. But his struggle to return to their hometowns to contribute to the population. In the spirit of overflowing, Saifullah establish a private school called the Institute of Glory.

Gemilang Institute opened in 1977 to provide a second chance to students. Those who fail or who can not take MCE and HSC examinations are most welcome in the school. Saifullah good faith to establish the Institute also supported from her former college friend, Umar (Kamal Adli), Asma (Tiz Zaqyah) and Ruhana (Tasha Shilla). They are all pioneers in the institute's teachers.

This is a character drama that depicted the four teachers into their golden years in which the characters are held Aimi Saifullah Jaar, Asmah (Kismah Johari), Umar (Zulkifli Zain) and Ruhana (Aznah Hamid).

Cast

Main character
Shah Jazle as Saifullah Ali
Tiz Zaqyah as Asma
Kamal Adli as Umar
Tasha Shilla as Ruhana
Datuk Jalaluddin Hassan as Talib
Izzue Islam as Halim
Naim Daniel as Saifullah Ali young
Azhan Rani as Ali, father to Saifullah 
Che Kem as father adopted Saifullah

The students of the Institute Gemilang
Talha Harith as Azlan
Munif Isa as Johan
Syazwan Zulkifli as Ringgo @ Rizal, son to gambler father
Puteri Chi Chi as Dahlia
Amin Abu Bakar as Kahar
Gregory Sze Lai Huat as Chee Keong
Kishz as Raj
Nashreen as Hamzah
Diandra Arjunaidi as Suzanne
Syed Ali sebagai as Saif second brother
Chomatt Samad as Sadiq, Saif fourth brother

International Broadcasting
Indonesia
 Channel: B Channel

References

External links
TV3 - Gemilang 

Malaysian drama television series
2011 Malaysian television series debuts
2011 Malaysian television series endings
2010s Malaysian television series
TV3 (Malaysia) original programming